The Ōtaki River is in the southwestern North Island of New Zealand. It turns northwest in the area of Ōtaki Forks, where it is joined by the Waiotauru River. After continuing through Otaki Gorge towards Kapiti Coast, it crosses State Highway 1 (SH1) south of Ōtaki and reaches the Tasman Sea south of the settlement of Ōtaki Beach.

The Ōtaki River is one of the major rivers that formed the fertile floodplains of the Kapiti Coast. The Ōtaki Forks area, accessible via Otaki Gorge Road, is a popular recreational area and the start of several tramping tracks into the Tararua Range.

The Ōtaki River also offers fishing of brown trout and whitebait.

Rivers of the Wellington Region
Kapiti Coast District
Tararua Range
Rivers of New Zealand